Aidong Men (born February 1966) is a professor and doctoral tutor at Beijing University of Posts and Telecommunications (BUPT). He is a director of the Multimedia Telecommunication Laboratory, and a member of the Academic Committee. He  is part of multiple committees relating to multimedia.

References

1966 births
Living people
Academic staff of Beijing University of Posts and Telecommunications